Ali John Meredith-Lacey (born 11 August 1991), better known under the moniker Novo Amor, is a Welsh multi-instrumentalist, singer, songwriter, sound designer and producer. Lacey rose to prominence after the release of his debut EP Woodgate, NY in March 2014.

Career 
Lacey was born on 11 August 1991 and raised in Llanidloes, Wales and now resides in Cardiff. Drift, a two-track single self-released in 2012, was Lacey's first release as Novo Amor.

Lacey's first Novo Amor EP, Woodgate, NY, was released 31 March 2014 on Norwegian label Brilliance Records. Building on the success of the EP, Lacey released the single "Faux", a collaboration with Ed Tullett, on Dumont Dumont and Brilliance Records on 23 June 2014. In the same month, Lacey also signed to UK publisher BDi Music, part of Bucks Music Group.

"Callow", a further single as Novo Amor, was released 17 November 2014. This was followed by "Welcome to the Jungle", a Guns N' Roses cover for an AXE/Lynx advertising campaign on 6 January 2015, its video directed by Nabil. Lacey toured Germany, Switzerland and Austria across April and May 2015, and was nominated for 2 awards at the Music Week Sync Awards for the use of his music commercially. "Anchor", another single as Novo Amor, was released 23 October 2015.

A second collaborative single with Ed Tullett, "Alps", was released on 15 April 2016.

On 26 May 2017, Bathing Beach, the second of Novo Amor's EPs, was released via AllPoints, the in-house label of Believe Recordings.

On 10 November 2017, Lacey and Ed Tullett released Heiress, their full collaborative album on All Points.

On 14 June 2018, Lacey announced his debut solo record Birthplace, to be released on 19 October 2018 via All Points. Promoting the releasing of the album, Lacey collaborated with Sil van der Woerd and Jorik Dozy (Studio Birthplace), the producer by Sean Lin and New Frontier Pictures, cinematograph Nihal Friedel to released the music video for the single as the same name 'Birthplace'. The music videos tells the human abuse of the oceans, around the view of free diver Michael Board. For the purpose of the video, according to Independent, "the 13-meter long model of the whale, which was made from plastic collected by school children, who received books in return for their donations." The music video was nominated on August 8 to the Association Of Independent Music (AIM) Awards winning the category 'Independent Video of the Year'.

Lacey toured with Gia Margaret in 2019. They recorded and released two songs together, "Lucky For You" and "No Fun" on 28 February 2019.

In August 2019, Lacey started working on his second full-length album at a home-made studio at Wales, UK. The album recording ended around February 2020. On 30 July 2020, he announced the release of his second solo album, Cannot Be, Whatsoever, through AllPoints on 6 November 2020. The album features an embroidered cover by Dutch artist Tilleke Schwarz, titled 'Birdcage', later becoming one of the songs titles in the album. On 2 December, Lacey released the album documentary titled 'Please Don't Stand Up When Room Is In Motion' directed by Josh Bennett.

Lacey’s songs have been featured in movie soundtracks from Five Feet Apart, Elite, and Life is Strange: True Colors.

Etymology 
Novo Amor is Portuguese for New Love. The artist confirmed in a tweet that the name had a "Portuguese/Latin" [sic] origin, without providing any further explanation. He stated in an interview that he went through a break-up in 2012 before he started producing and that led to this name as he found his "New Love" in music.

Discography

Studio albums

Extended plays

Singles

References

External links 
 Official website
 Novo Amor on Facebook
 Novo Amor on Twitter

1991 births
Living people
People from Aberystwyth
People from Llanidloes
Welsh singer-songwriters
21st-century Welsh male singers